Sju or SJU may refer to:

 Sju Hundred, a former subdivision of Uppland, Sweden
 Ume Sámi, ISO 639 language code sju
 Luis Muñoz Marín International Airport, in Carolina, Puerto Rico, IATA airport code SJU
 St. Jerome's University, in Waterloo, Ontario, Canada
 Saint Joseph's University, in Philadelphia, Pennsylvania, U.S.
 Saint John's University (disambiguation), the name of several institutions
 Sejong University, Seoul, Republic of Korea